The 44th Missile Wing (44 MW) is an inactive United States Air Force unit.   Its last assignment was with Twentieth Air Force, being assigned to Ellsworth AFB, South Dakota.   It was inactivated on 4 July 1994.

For over 40 years the 44th was a front-line Strategic Air Command wing, initially as a B-47 Stratojet medium bomber unit in the 1950s.  With the phaseout of the B-47, the wing became a LGM-30 Minuteman ICBM unit in the 1960s, being inactivated in 1994 as part of the drawdown of U.S. strategic forces after the end of the Cold War.

During World War II, its predecessor unit, the 44th Bombardment Group was the first B-24 Liberator heavy bombardment group of VIII Bomber Command stationed in England.  Colonel Leon W. Johnson, while commander of the 44th Bombardment Group, was awarded the Medal of Honor for his actions during the Ploesti Raid on 1 August 1943.

History
 For additional history and lineage, see 44th Operations Group

Bombardment Wing
The 44th Bombardment Wing, Medium was established in late December 1950 as part of the postwar Hobson Plan.  The 90th Bombardment Group, reactivated by Strategic Air Command (SAC) in 1947 was assigned as its combat group.   The new wing was organized at March AFB, California where it received B-29 Superfortresses along with some TB-29s. Depended on 22d Bombardment Wing for initial cadre and help in becoming organized.

The wing was reassigned to Lake Charles AFB, Louisiana on 1 August 1951; its mission was to train B-29 and RB-29 aircrews and mechanics for combat duty with units engaged in Korean War combat duty with Far East Air Forces.   From 10 October 1951 to 15 May 1952, trained all elements of the 68th Strategic Reconnaissance Wing.

Replaced the propeller-driven B-29s with new B-47E Stratojet swept-wing medium bombers in 1953, capable of flying at high subsonic speeds and primarily designed for penetrating the airspace of the Soviet Union.  Deployed at Sidi Slimane Air Base, French Morocco, 19 January – 22 February 1953 and 19 April –  17 June 1954.

In the late 1950s, the B-47 was considered to be reaching obsolescence, and was being phased out of SAC's strategic arsenal as improved Soviet air defenses made the aircraft vulnerable.   Began sending aircraft to other B-47 wings as replacements in late 1959, being phased down for inactivation.   The 44th Bombardment Wing was inactivated on 15 June 1960; some aircraft and many personnel were reassigned to the 68th Bombardment Wing which remained at Lake Charles AFB flying B-47s until 1963.

Missile Wing
The history of the 44th Missile Wing begins two years before its activation; with the establishment of the 850th Strategic Missile Squadron on 1 December 1960.   Assigned to the 28th Bombardment Wing at Ellsworth AFB, South Dakota, the 850th SMS operated the first-generation HGM-25A Titan I ICBM at three dispersed sites near Wicksville, Hermosa, and Sturgis SD.  However the Titan I's life span was short in western South Dakota.

About the same time, work began on installations for the second-generation Minuteman missile. On 21 August 1961, construction began on the LGM-30B Minuteman I facilities.  For more than a year this squadron prepared for the emplacement of the Minuteman  which finally arrived in 1962, shortly after the activation of the 44th Strategic Missile Wing (SMW) in January. At that time Headquarters SAC also named the 44 SMW as host wing at Ellsworth.  With its activation, the 850th SMS was reassigned to the 44th SMW, making the 28th Bombardment Wing a fully B-52 Stratofortress organization.

During 1962, three new strategic missile squadrons, the 66th, 67th, and 68th, were activated to support the new Minuteman I system. The 67th Strategic Missile Squadron joined the 44th in August, followed by the 68th Strategic Missile Squadron in September 1962. A 44th Missile Maintenance Squadron was established at the same time. Each strategic missile squadron supported five flights of Minuteman missiles with 50 missiles per squadron.  A total of 150 launch facilities were constructed to house the missiles. The first Minuteman missile was positioned near Wall, SD in April 1963. All Minuteman I missiles were in place by the end of 1963.

On 19 November 1964, Secretary of Defense Robert McNamara announced the phase-out of remaining first-generation Titan I missiles by the end of June 1965. Consequently, the Titan Is of the 850th SMS were removed from alert status on 4 January 1965. The last missile was shipped out on 12 February. The Air Force subsequently inactivated the squadron on 25 March.

Ellsworth was slated to host a unique series of operational tests. Approved by the Secretary of Defense in November 1964, "Project Long Life" called for the short-range operational base launch of three modified Minuteman IB ICBMs to provide a realistic test for this system. Each missile would contain enough propellant for a 7-second flight and have inert upper stages and reentry vehicles. On 1 March 1965, "Operation Long Life" took place. This was the first of three scheduled launches of the Minuteman system. A missile with seven seconds of fuel was launched.

With the test proving successful, the additional two launches were canceled. This was the only test launch in US ICBM history to be fired from an operational site.  It successfully demonstrated the ability of a SAC missile crew to launch an ICBM.

The 44 SMW played a key role in establishing the Airborne Launch Control System (ALCS) in the late 1960s. The ALCS was created to provide a survivable launch capability for the Minuteman ICBM force. From 1967 to 1970, one of the squadrons that ALCS missile crews belonged to was the 68th SMS at Ellsworth AFB, SD. These ALCS crews worked together with the 28th Air Refueling Squadron (AREFS) at Ellsworth AFB, who operated several EC-135 variants to include the EC-135A, EC-135G, and EC-135L, all of which had ALCS equipment installed on board. In 1970, the ALCS mission was transferred from the 68th SMS to the 4th Airborne Command and Control Squadron, which was assigned to the 28th Bombardment Wing at Ellsworth AFB, SD.

On 30 June 1971, the 44 SMW was named host unit at Ellsworth AFB when the 821st Strategic Aerospace Division was inactivated. The wing was reassigned under the 4th Air Division headquartered at F.E. Warren AFB, Wyoming . The wing was later assigned as part of the 57th Air Division headquartered at Minot AFB, North Dakota.

In October 1971, the transition from Minuteman I to LGM-30F Minuteman II began. The transition, known as "Force Modernization", was complete in March 1973. With these new missiles in place, Ellsworth was selected to host "Giant Pace Test 74-1", the first Simulated Electronic Launch-Minuteman (SELM) exercise. During this test, 11 SELM-configured Minuteman II ICBMs underwent successful simulated launch on command from both underground launch-control centers and the Airborne Launch Control System.

During February 1991, the Secretary of Defense announced that the Air Force would begin retirement of older weapon systems in response to the end of the Cold War and a declining defense budget. The deactivation of the Minuteman II missile system was announced on 15 April 1991. The schedule for Ellsworth included a one squadron per year draw-down beginning with the 67 SMS, followed by the 66 SMS, and finally the 68 SMS.

On 1 September 1991, under the "Objective Wing" concept adapted by the Air Force, the wing was renamed the 44th Missile Wing.  The ICBM squadrons were reassigned to the newly established 44th Operations Group, along with the lineage, honors and history of the 44th Bombardment Group.

On 28 September 1991, in response to President Bush's directive to stand down the Minuteman II, personnel of the 44 OG worked around the clock to dissipate launch codes and pin safety control switches at 150 launch facilities. Removal of the first Minuteman II missile assigned to the 44 OG occurred at G-02, near Red Owl, South Dakota, on 3 December 1991. On 6 April 1992, the first launch control center shut down.

On 1 June 1992, the 44th Missile Wing was relieved of its emergency war order mission and its primary focus was deactivation of the Minuteman II weapon system. This day also marked the end of SAC and the beginning of Air Combat Command (ACC).

The 67th Missile Squadron (MS) was inactivated on 15 August 1992, and the 66 MS was inactivated on 1 September 1993. On 1 July 1993 the 44 Missile Wing changed hands from ACC to Air Force Space Command along with all other ICBM wings. Deactivation of the entire missile complex ended in April 1994.

With its mission complete, the 44th Missile Wing was formally inactivated on 4 July 1994.

Lineage

 Established as 44th Bombardment Wing, Medium, on 20 December 1950.
 Activated on 2 January 1951
 Discontinued on 15 June 1960
 Re-designated 44th Strategic Missile Wing (ICBM—Minuteman) on 24 November 1961
 Organized on 1 January 1962.
 Re-designated: 44th Missile Wing 1 September 1991
 Inactivated 5 July 1994

Assignments
 Fifteenth Air Force, 20 December 1950
 12th Air Division, 10 February 1951
 21st Air Division, 4 August 1951
 806th Air Division, 16 June 1952
 Attached to: 5th Air Division from 19 January to 22 February 1953
 Attached to: 5th Air Division 9 April to 17 June 1954
 Department of the Air Force, 15 June 1960 – 23 November 1961
 821st Strategic Aerospace Division, 1 January 1962
 4th Strategic Missile Division, 30 June 1971
 57th Air Division, 1 May 1982
 4th Air Division, 23 January 1987
 12th Air Division, 15 July 1988
 Strategic Warfare Center, 31 July 1990
 Twentieth Air Force, 31 July 1991 – 5 July 1994

ComponentsGroup 44th Bombardment (later Operations) Group: 2 January 1951 – 16 June 1952 (not operational, 10 February 1951 – 16 June 1952), 1 September 1991 – 5 July 1994Squadrons' 44th Air Refueling Squadron: 20 April 1953 – 1 June 1960 (not operational, 20 April – c. 15 May 1953; detached 27 June – 11 October 1957).
 66th Bombardment (later, Strategic Missile, later Missile) Squadron: 16 Jun 1952 – 15 Jun 1960; 1 Sep 1962 – 1 Sep 1991
 67th Bombardment (later, Strategic Missile, later Missile) Squadron: 16 Jun 1952 – 15 Jun 1960; 1 Sep 1962 – 1 Sep 1991
 68th Bombardment (later, Strategic Missile, later Missile) Squadron: 16 Jun 1952 – 15 Jun 1960; 1 Sep 1962 – 1 Sep 1991
 506th Bombardment Squadron: 1 December 1958 – 15 June 1960
 850th Strategic Missile Squadron: 1 January 1962 – 25 March 1965

Bases Assigned
 March AFB, California, 2 January 1951 – 1 August 1951
 Lake Charles (later Chennault) AFB, Louisiana 1 August 1951 – 15 June 1960
 Deployed at Sidi Slimane Air Base, French Morocco, 19 January – 22 February 1953 and 19 April –  17 June 1954.
 Ellsworth AFB, South Dakota, 24 November 1961 – 5 July 1994

Aircraft and missiles

 TB-29 Superfortress, 1951; B-29 Superfortress, 1951–1953
 B-47 Stratojet, 1953–1960
 KC-97 Stratofreighter, 1953–1957, 1957–1960
 HGM-25A Titan I, 1962–1965
 850th Strategic Missile Squadron
 Operated three missile sites: (1 Dec 1960 – 25 Mar 1965)
 850-A, 4 miles NNW of Wicksville, South Dakota 
 850-B, 5 miles SSE of Hermosa, South Dakota    
 850-C, 10 miles SE of Sturgis, South Dakota    
 LGM-30B Minuteman I, 1963–1973
 Airborne Launch Control System, 1967–1970
 LGM-30F Minuteman II, 1971–1994
LGM-30F Minuteman III Missile Alert Facilities (MAF) (each controlling 10 missiles) are located as follows:

 66th Missile Squadron
 A-01 19.9 mi S of Howes, SD, 
 B-01 7.5 mi NxNW of Wall SD, 
 C-01 10.1 mi N of Philip SD, 
 *D-01 6.7 mi SxSW of Cottonwood SD,  
 *D-09 (Launch Facility) 4.4 mi SxSW of Quinn SD, 
 *Designated as part of the Minuteman Missile National Historic Site
 E-01 6.3 mi NxNE of Kadoka SD, 
 67th Missile Squadron
 F-01 61.0 mi NxNE of Ellsworth AFB, SD.  
 G-01 11.3 mi N of Union Center SD,  
 H-01 10.0 mi SW of Union Center SD, 
 I-01 5.7 mi E of White Owl SD, 
 J-01 13.8 mi SE of Maurine SD, 
 68th Missile Squadron
 K-01 5.6 mi N of Spearfish SD, 
 L-01 6.2 mi SxSE of Vale SD,   
 M-01 17.7 mi NxNW of Belle Fourche SD, 
 N-01 6.7 mi NW of Newell SD, 
 O-01 38.5 mi W of opal, SD, 

References for commands and major units assigned, components and stations:Maurer, Maurer (1983). Air Force Combat Units of World War II. Maxwell AFB, Alabama: Office of Air Force History. .

See also

 List of B-29 Superfortress operators
 List of B-47 units of the United States Air Force
 44th Missile Wing LGM-30 Minuteman Missile Launch Sites

References

 Ellsworth AFB Minuteman Missile Site Coordinates
 Mackay, Ron and Steve Adams. The 44th Bomb Group in World War II: The 'Flying Eight-Balls' Over Europe in the B-24''. Atglen, Pennsylvania: Schiffer Publishing, 2007. .

044
Military units and formations in South Dakota
1951 establishments in California
1994 disestablishments in South Dakota